Gordon Louis Charles 'Sonny' Maffina (10 January 1926 – 10 September 1991) was an Australian rules footballer who played 114 games for Claremont in the West Australian National Football League (WANFL) from 1948 to 1958. 

Centreman Gordon Maffina, nicknamed Sonny, arrived at Claremont from Goldfields National Football League club Boulder City. He made an immediate impact at Claremont with a Sandover Medal win in 1949 as well as being awarded his club's Best and fairest. 

He represented Western Australia at the 1950 Brisbane Carnival where he was a Simpson Medalilst and appeared in a total of eight interstates matches for his state. 

Appointed captain-coach of Claremont in 1952 after captaining them the previous year, Maffina remained in the role until the end of the 1953 season. He continued on as a player, returning briefly as captain-coach in 1957, but suffered from niggling injuries towards the end of his career and retired in 1958. When Claremont took out the 1964 premiership he was the assistant coach.

References

External links

Australian rules footballers from Western Australia
Claremont Football Club players
Sandover Medal winners
Claremont Football Club coaches
Boulder City Football Club players
1926 births
1991 deaths
People from Boulder, Western Australia